Eichelbach is a small river of Bavaria, Germany. It is a right tributary of the Baunach in the village Heubach of Ebern.

See also
List of rivers of Bavaria

References

Rivers of Bavaria
Rivers of Germany